Jairo Jair Concha Gonzáles (born 27 May 1999) is a Peruvian footballer who plays as a midfielder for Peruvian Primera División side Alianza Lima.

Career

Youth career
Concha grew up in Huaylas in the Chorrillos District of Lima. He started at a football academy called Academia de Fútbol Julinho in Peru at the age of 8, before he at the age of 11 a training camp arranged by San Martín in Chorrillos, where they chose about 60 boys to be part of the club. Finally, only 30 remained and from there he was part of Universidad San Martín, a club to which he has belonged since 2012. Concha joined the reserves team in 2016 and eventually ended up joining the first team thanks to coach José Guillermo del Solar.

Club career
On 23 February 2017, Concha got his official debut for San Martín against Sport Rosario in the Peruvian Primera División. Concha started on the bench, but came in for the last five minutes, replacing Ramiro Cáseres. He made a total of 5 appearances in that season.

He was one of the revelation players of Peruvian football in 2018 and on August 25 of that year, he also scored his first goal as a professional in the 3–2 defeat against FBC Melgar. Having had a wonderful season with 37 league appearances, San Martín decided to not let him go ahead of the 2019 season, although there was big interest in the 19-year old midfielder, followed by several important clubs from Peru and Mexico. In addition, he also won the award for best revelation player in the 2018 Torneo Descentralizado.

The following season however saw little action due to various injuries, including one to the fifth metatarsal bone that kept him off the playing field for three and a half months. In that 2019 campaign, he only played 18 games, also missing games with the U23 team and the 2019 Pan American Games.

In the beginning of January 2020, San Martín refused once again to sell Concha, with big interest from Alianza Lima. However, one month later, it was confirmed that Alianza had bought him free, but he would remain at San Martín on loan until the end of the season. In the summer 2020, Alianza wanted to recall Concha, but San Martín refused to let him go until the end of the loan deal.

International career
Concha has represented Peru in the U18, U20 and U23 categories. With the U-20 team he scored 3 goals in 13 games and participated in the 2019 South American U-20 Championship.

In March 2018, Concha was one of the youth players called as reinforcements for the training of the senior team, at the disposal of coach Ricardo Gareca, ahead of two friendlies against Croatia and Iceland, prior to the Peruvian participation in the 2018 FIFA World Cup.

On 12 January 2019, he was included in the roster of 23 players for the 2019 2019 South American U-20 Championship He played all four matches during the group stage, however Peru did not advance to the next stage.

On 27 November 2019, the under-23 team was summoned to participate in the 2020 CONMEBOL Pre-Olympic Tournament, where he played all the games.

References

External links
 

Living people
1999 births
Association football midfielders
Peruvian footballers
Peru youth international footballers
Peruvian Primera División players
Club Deportivo Universidad de San Martín de Porres players
Club Alianza Lima footballers
People from Lima